The Scream is a Greek miniseries written and directed by Eleftheria Karadimou. That was the second miniseries by Eleftheria after The Angeldressed Demon.

Plot

Episode 1: a woman named Nana starts to have weird dreams about werewolves and a strange creature chasing her in a forest, after a few days she hears her mother named Katia talking with another woman about Nana actually being adopted and that her parents are probably dead but were living in Kavala, Nana confronts Katia and tells her that she heard her talking about her being adopted and decides to go to Kavala to visit her dead parents' house.

Episode 2: Nana meets her aunt named Eleftheria and Eleftheria tells her that her father is still alive and is living in England, a 53 years old woman in the forest named Baso tells her kids (Dimitris and Ebita) that a girl (Nana) is destined to kill them, Baso also tells to her kids that she had killed Nana's mother and they need to kill Nana too.

Episode 3: a strange man named Joseph starts to stalk Nana and after a few days of stalking he confirms to her that he was sent by his father to protect her from Baso but Nana doesn't believe him. Nana then happens to pass outside of a cemetery and decides to walk inside the cemetery but she starts to hallucinate demons chasing her and decides to leave the cemetery.

Episode 4: Nana discovers a strange book left by her deceased mother, after many weeks of reading the book Nana trains herself to be a werewolf hunter, the book also says that Baso is the whore of Babylon and a werewolf and that her kids are too.

Episode 5: Joseph and Nana's father named George to arrive in Kabala to search for Nana together, Dimitris is then sent to kill Nana but after a small fight Nana runs away and Dimitris starts to chase her, Dimitris steals a truck and starts to chase Nana, however, she also gets in her car and a chase ensues between the two, Joseph and George also steal an armored van and start to chase Dimitris's truck, Joseph starts shooting at the tires of the Dimitris' truck and he crashes in a lake.

Episode 6: Nana gets in the armored van and the three people decide to go to a village called Palaiomonastiro so Nana could be trained to become a proper werewolf hunter. Nana also meets a man named "The Antynudity" who wears a clown costume, he tells Nana that he kills or at least injures whoever is naked and that he is the co-leader of the village. He also reveals that he is the second-cousin of George.

Episode 7: Nana continues her training in the village and George sees at the news that an RFID Microchip will become mandatory in the next month.

Episode 8: Nana, Joseph, and George go to Kavala to kill Baso and her kids, on their way they kill Evita and Dimitris and finally confront Baso, who is shot down by George. A few hours later George calls The Antynudity in his phone to tell him that he needs to construct a wall around the village because the RFID Microchip is the mark of the beast, when The Antynudty asks why he should do that, George says that the wall needs to be constructed so that people that will try to enforce the chip won't be able to enter the village, a few minutes later George is attacked and seemingly killed by Evita.

Credits

 Eleftheria Karadimou as Eleftheria
 Baso Ziarou as Baso
 Nana Asimidou as Nana
 Thanasis Erikanos as The Antynudity
 Takis Papadimitriou as George
 Joseph Gargano as Joseph
 Ebita Asimidio as Ebita
 Dimitris Trabankas as Dimitris
 Nikos Strabangas as Villager
 Renios Barganou as Trucker
 Kostas Arganos as Second Villager
 Lefteris Barganou as Village Shop Owner

References
 #HelpRia
 Ζόμπι, εγκλήματα, έρωτες: σειρές από την επαρχία που δίνουν στα σήριαλ την αίγλη που τους αξίζει

External links
 Η cult σκηνοθέτης από την Καβάλα αποσύρεται και το ίντερνετ θέλει να τη σώσει
 Η μεγάλη, κοσμοπολίτικη επιστροφή της Ελευθερίας Καραδήμου, μέσα απ' τα δικά της λόγια Πηγή

Horror comedy